Jock Campbell may refer to:

Jock Campbell (British Army officer) (1894–1942), British Army officer and recipient of the Victoria Cross
Jock Campbell, Baron Campbell of Eskan (1912–1994), British businessman
Jock Campbell (footballer) (1922–1983), Scottish footballer (Charlton Athletic FC)
Jock Campbell (rugby union) (born 1995), Australian rugby union player